Frédéric Mendy (born 18 September 1988) is a professional footballer who plays as a forward for Évreux. Born in France, Mendy represents the Guinea-Bissau national team.

Club career
Mendy began his career with French non-league club FC Rezé and for CFA 2 club Évreux FC before signing to Étoile FC who had registered to participate in the Singapore S.League, one of the few leagues that allows foreign teams to participate. As of Round 23 he has scored 15 goals, the S.League's highest goalscorer. He scored one goal in the 2010 Singapore League Cup against Geylang United as Étoile went on to win the cup. He scored a brace against Cambodian Club Phnom Penh Crown in the 2010 Singapore Cup in which Étoile won 2–1 and progressed through to the Quarter Finals.

Mendy in his first season for Étoile, would go on to score 21 goals in 32 appearances, receiving the Golden Boot for the 2010 season. Étoile would also be crowned champions. Mendy joined Home United at the start of the 2011 S-League season. He scored his first goal for Home United in the fourth minute of a 2–1 against Albirex Niigata(S).

His fifth goal for the club came on April Fools' Day when he struck an 81st-minute equaliser against Tampines Rovers. It ended 1–1 and helping Home United remain unbeaten in the S-League after 25 games.

In 2013, Mendy, who speaks some Portuguese, moved from Singapore to Portugal for the first time in his career.

He moved to Korea to sign for K League 1 side Ulsan Hyundai in 2016.

Mendy signed for Korean side Jeju United for the 2017 K League 1 season from rivals Ulsan Hyundai. He scored his first goal for the club in the AFC Champions League in a 3–3 thriller against Australian side Adelaide United.

International career
Mendy was born in Évreux, France and is of Mandjack (Guinea Bissau) descent. He was called up the Guinea-Bissau national team, and made his debut in a 2017 Africa Cup of Nations qualification win over Zambia wherein he scored his debut goal.

Career statistics
Scores and results list Guinea-Bissau's goal tally first, score column indicates score after each Mendy goal.

References

External links

1988 births
Living people
Footballers from Paris
Bissau-Guinean footballers
Guinea-Bissau international footballers
French footballers
French people of Bissau-Guinean descent
Citizens of Guinea-Bissau through descent
Association football forwards
Étoile FC players
Évreux FC 27 players
Home United FC players
G.D. Estoril Praia players
Moreirense F.C. players
C.F. União players
Ulsan Hyundai FC players
Jeju United FC players
Frederic Mendy
Vitória F.C. players
Singapore Premier League players
Primeira Liga players
Liga Portugal 2 players
K League 1 players
French expatriate footballers
Bissau-Guinean expatriate footballers
French expatriate sportspeople in Singapore
Expatriate footballers in Singapore
Bissau-Guinean expatriate sportspeople in Portugal
French expatriate sportspeople in Portugal
Expatriate footballers in Portugal
Expatriate footballers in South Korea
French expatriate sportspeople in South Korea
Expatriate footballers in Thailand
French expatriate sportspeople in Thailand
2017 Africa Cup of Nations players
2019 Africa Cup of Nations players
2021 Africa Cup of Nations players